Stephen Clifford Cox (born 6 January 1956) is a retired racing cyclist from New Zealand, who represented his native country at the 1984 Summer Olympics. There he finished in 37th place in the men's individual road race. Cox won the bronze medal at the 1982 Commonwealth Games in Brisbane, Australia.

Major accomplishments 

1978
1st Overall Tour of North
1979
1st Overall Dulux
1980
1st Overall Tour of North
1981
1st Overall Tour of Waikato
1st Overall Tour of Southland
1982
 1st Graften to Inverell Classic
 1st Overall Tour of Southland
 3rd Commonwealth Games 100K TTT, Brisbane, Australia
1983
 1st Overall Tour of Waikato
 2nd Overall Tour of Southland
1984
 1st Overall Tour of North
 1st Overall  Tour of Wellington

References

External links
 New Zealand Olympic Committee
 Double winner back for fiftieth Southland celebrations
 Waka-Roc - Fun, Friendly and Affordable
 

1956 births
Living people
New Zealand male cyclists
Cyclists at the 1984 Summer Olympics
Olympic cyclists of New Zealand
Sportspeople from Whanganui
Commonwealth Games medallists in cycling
Commonwealth Games bronze medallists for New Zealand
Cyclists at the 1982 Commonwealth Games
20th-century New Zealand people
21st-century New Zealand people
Medallists at the 1982 Commonwealth Games